Adele Rowland (born Adele P. Levi; July 10, 1883 – August 8, 1971) was an American actress and singer.

Biography

She was born on July 10, 1883 as Adele P. Levi in Washington, D.C., the youngest daughter of Abraham D. Levi and Addie (Lloyd) Levi. She had a sister, Mabel Rowland (1879–1943), who was an actress, monologist, producer and director, and a brother, Harmon L. Rowland (1896–1971), a real estate broker in Los Angeles, California.

A soprano known for her effervescent personality, Rowland was a standout in musical comedy productions from 1904, specializing in "story songs". She was best known for her rendition of the song "Pack Up Your Troubles in Your Old Kit-Bag", which she introduced in 1915 in the Broadway production of Her Soldier Boy.

Rowland later moved to Los Angeles, where they were a prominent couple. She made a career playing small parts in motion pictures, acting well into the 1950s.

Personal life
She married actor Charlie Ruggles in 1914 and they divorced in 1916. She married stage and film actor Conway Tearle in 1918; he died in 1938.

Death
She died on August 8, 1971, in Los Angeles.

Filmography
 1950 The Secret Fury
 1948 For the Love of Mary
 1948 The Big Punch 
 1942 Lucky Legs 
 1942 A Tragedy at Midnight 
 1941 The Blonde from Singapore

References

External links

1883 births
1971 deaths
People from Washington, D.C.
American stage actresses
American film actresses